The Australian and New Zealand Army Corps (ANZAC) was originally a First World War army corps of the Mediterranean Expeditionary Force. It was formed in Egypt in December 1914, and operated during the Gallipoli campaign. General William Birdwood commanded the corps, which primarily consisted of troops from the First Australian Imperial Force and 1st New Zealand Expeditionary Force, although there were also British and Indian units attached at times throughout the campaign. The corps disbanded in 1916, following the Allied evacuation of the Gallipoli peninsula and the formation of I ANZAC Corps and II ANZAC Corps. The corps was reestablished, briefly, in the Second World War during the Battle of Greece in 1941. The term 'ANZAC' has been used since for joint Australian–New Zealand units of different sizes.

History

Original formation

Plans for the formation began in November 1914 while the first contingent of Australian and New Zealand troops were still in convoy bound for, as they thought, Europe. However, following the experiences of the Canadian Expeditionary Force encamped on Salisbury Plain, where there was a shortage of accommodation and equipment, it was decided not to subject the Australians and New Zealanders to the English winter, and so they were diverted to Egypt for training before moving on to the Western Front in France. The British Secretary of State for War, Horatio Kitchener, appointed General William Birdwood, an officer of the British Indian Army, to the command of the corps and he furnished most of the corps staff from the Indian Army as well. Birdwood arrived in Cairo on 21 December 1914 to assume command of the corps.

It was originally intended to name the corps the Australasian Army Corps, this title being used in the unit diary in line with the common practice of the time which often saw New Zealanders and Australians compete together as Australasia in sporting events. However, complaints from New Zealand recruits led to adoption of the name Australian and New Zealand Army Corps. The administration clerks found the title too cumbersome so quickly adopted the abbreviation A. & N.Z.A.C. or simply ANZAC. Shortly afterwards it was officially adopted as the codename for the corps, but it did not enter common usage amongst the troops until after the Gallipoli landings.

At the outset, the corps comprised two divisions; the Australian Division, composed of the 1st, 2nd and 3rd Australian Infantry Brigades and the New Zealand and Australian Division, composed of the New Zealand Infantry Brigade, New Zealand Mounted Rifles Brigade, Australian 1st Light Horse Brigade and 4th Australian Infantry Brigade. The 2nd and 3rd Australian Light Horse Brigades were assigned as corps level troops, belonging to neither division.

Despite being synonymous with Australia and New Zealand, ANZAC was a multi-national body: in addition to the many British officers in the corps and division staffs, the Australian and New Zealand Army Corps contained, at various points, the 7th Brigade of the Indian Mountain Artillery, Ceylon Planters Rifle Corps troops, the Zion Mule Corps, several battalions from the Royal Naval Division, the British 13th (Western) Division, one brigade of the British 10th (Irish) Division and the 29th Indian Brigade.

Later formations

World War I
Following the evacuation of the Gallipoli peninsula, in December 1915, the Australian and New Zealand units reassembled in Egypt. The New Zealand contingent expanded to form their own division; the New Zealand Division. The First Australian Imperial Force underwent a major reorganisation resulting in the formation of two new divisions; the 4th and 5th divisions. (The Australian 3rd Division was forming in Australia and would be sent directly to England and then to France.) These divisions were reformed into two corps: I ANZAC Corps and II ANZAC Corps. I ANZAC Corps, under the command of General Birdwood, departed for France in early 1916. II ANZAC Corps, commanded by Lieutenant General Alexander Godley, followed soon after.

In January 1916, the 4th (ANZAC) Battalion, Imperial Camel Corps, was formed with Australian and New Zealand troops. The 1st and 3rd Battalions were Australian, while the 2nd Battalion was British. Then in March 1916, the ANZAC Mounted Division with three Australian and one New Zealand brigade, was formed for service in Egypt and Palestine. There was also the 1st (ANZAC) Wireless Signal Squadron, which served with the British expeditionary force in Mesopotamia in 1916–1917.

In early 1916, the Australian and, to a lesser extent, New Zealand governments sought the creation of an Australian and New Zealand Army, which would have included the New Zealand Division and all of the Australian infantry divisions, but this did not occur.

World War II

During World War II, the Australian I Corps HQ moved to Greece in March 1941 (Operation Lustre). As the corps also controlled the New Zealand 2nd Division (along with Greek and British formations), it was officially renamed ANZAC Corps on 12 April. The Battle of Greece was over in weeks and the corps HQ evacuated mainland Greece on 23–24 April, with the name ANZAC Corps no longer being used.

Some troops evacuated to Alexandria, but the majority were sent to the Greek island of Crete to reinforce its garrison against an expected German invasion from air and sea. Australians and New Zealanders were respectively deployed around the cities of Rethymno and Chania in western Crete with a smaller Australian force being positioned in Heraklion. The invasion began the morning of 20 May and, after the fierce Battle of Crete, which lasted ten days, Crete fell to the Germans. Most of the defenders of Chania withdrew across the island to the south coast and were evacuated by the Royal Navy from Sfakia. Many others evaded capture for several months, hiding in the mountains with generous assistance from the local Cretan population. Others who were captured and transported to Axis POW camps in mainland Europe were able to escape en route via Yugoslavia. Those who escaped found refuge with Chetniks and Yugoslav Partisans until they were either repatriated or recaptured by Axis forces.

Other conflicts

During the Vietnam War, two companies from the Royal New Zealand Infantry Regiment were integrated into Royal Australian Regiment battalions. These integrated battalions had the suffix (ANZAC) added to their name (for example, 4 RAR became the 4RAR/NZ (ANZAC) Battalion). An ANZAC battalion served as one of the infantry battalions of the 1st Australian Task Force (1 ATF) from early March 1968 until its withdrawal in December 1971. Due to the rotation of forces, there were a total of five combined battalions of this period.

The ANZAC Battle Group was the official designation of Australian and New Zealand units deployed to Timor Leste as part of Operation Astute. The battle group was established in September 2006.

See also
ANZAC day
Colour of War: The Anzacs, includes rare colour footage
Military history of Australia during World War I
Military history of New Zealand during World War I

References

Bibliography

Further reading

External links

Anzac Day Act 1995
Visit Gallipoli: Australian site about Gallipoli and the Anzacs, includes previously unpublished photographs, artworks and documents from Government archives. A site by the Australian Department of Veterans' Affairs.
Discovering Anzacs, includes service records and profiles from National Archives of Australia and Archives NZ for those who enlisted in WWI.
New Zealanders at Gallipoli
 An ongoing collection of geo-mapped  Australian & ANZAC War Memorial photographs.
 Listen to an excerpt from a simulated recording of Australian troops docking in Egypt after their voyage from Australia to take part in the First World War on australianscreen online.
This recording was added to the National Film and Sound Archive's Sounds of Australia Registry in 2007
Measuring the ANZACS – a citizen science project
Seal, Graham: Anzac (Australia), in: 1914-1918-online. International Encyclopedia of the First World War.
Monash University: One Hundred Stories (Online Exhibition)
Beersheba ANZAC Memorial Center

 
ANZAC units and formations
Corps of Australia
Military units and formations of New Zealand
Military units and formations established in 1914
Military units and formations of Australia in World War I
New Zealand in World War I
1914 establishments in Australia
1914 establishments in New Zealand
Military units and formations of the British Empire in World War II
Military units and formations disestablished in 1916